À vous les femmes is a 1979 album by Julio Iglesias.

Track listing

Certifications and sales

References

1979 albums
Julio Iglesias albums
French-language albums
CBS Records albums